Thorhild County is a municipal district located in the central part of northern Alberta, Canada in Census Division 13. It was incorporated in 1955. It changed its name from the County of Thorhild No. 7 to Thorhild County on March 20, 2013.

The administrative offices of Thorhild County are in the Hamlet of Thorhild.

Geography

Communities and localities 
The following urban municipalities are surrounded by Thorhild County.
Cities
none
Towns
none
Villages
none
Summer villages
none

The following hamlets are located within Thorhild County.
Hamlets
Abee
Egremont
Long Lake
Newbrook
Opal
Radway (dissolved from village status in 1996)
Thorhild (dissolved from village status in 2009)

The following localities are located within Thorhild County.
Localities 
Alpen
Alpen Siding
Balsam Grove
Clearbrook
Crippsdale
Dalmuir
Danube
Darling
Elbridge
Hollow Lake
Kerensky
Mapova
Northbrook
Pinebrook
Val Soucy
Weasel Creek
Woodgrove

Demographics 

In the 2016 Census of Population conducted by Statistics Canada, Thorhild County had a population of 3,254 living in 1,401 of its 1,836 total private dwellings, a  change from its 2011 population of 3,417.

See also 
List of communities in Alberta
List of municipal districts in Alberta

References

External links 

 
Municipal districts in Alberta